This is a list of the universities in Germany, of which there are about seventy. The list also includes German Technische Universitäten (universities of technology), which have official and full university status, but usually focus on engineering and the natural sciences rather than covering the whole spectrum of academic disciplines. Some twenty German universities rank among top 200 universities in world Highest ranked universities in Germany include some research oriented universities for MS, MBA, medical and engineering.

The list does not, however, cover the German Fachhochschulen (University of Applied Sciences) or institutions that cover only certain disciplines such as business studies, fine arts, or engineering. Those do not have all of the responsibilities and limitations of universities, and most cannot award doctorate degrees on their own.

A private university is included in the list if it awards its own doctorate degree. 

In general, public German universities do not charge tuition fees. At many universities this usually also applies to foreign students, though regulations for non-EU foreign citizens differ regionally. Universities may charge small fees for administrative costs.

Universities by date of establishment 

This is a list of the ten oldest universities that have been in continuous operation since their founding in present-day Germany.

Some universities were established in the 14th or 15th centuries, but shut down for longer periods and later re-opened (e.g. the universities of Cologne, Erfurt, Ingolstadt, Mainz and Würzburg). These are not included in this list.

Universities alphabetically

A–D 
 RWTH Aachen
 Anhalt University of Applied Sciences
 University of Augsburg
 University of Bamberg
 University of Bayreuth
 Berlin University of the Arts
 Free University of Berlin
 Humboldt University of Berlin
 Technical University of Berlin
 Bielefeld University
 Ruhr University Bochum
 University of Bonn
 Brandenburg University of Technology
 Braunschweig University of Technology
 University of Bremen
 Jacobs University Bremen
 Chemnitz University of Technology
 Clausthal University of Technology
 CODE University of Applied Sciences
 University of Cologne
 Darmstadt University of Technology
 TU Dortmund University
 Dresden University of Technology
 University of Duisburg-Essen
 University of Düsseldorf

E–H
 Catholic University of Eichstätt-Ingolstadt
 University of Erfurt
 University of Erlangen-Nuremberg
 University of Duisburg-Essen 
 ESCP Business School
 University of Flensburg
 Goethe University of Frankfurt am Main
 Viadrina University (Frankfurt an der Oder)
 Freiberg University of Mining and Technology
 Zeppelin University (Friedrichshafen)
 University of Freiburg
 University of Giessen
 University of Göttingen
 University of Greifswald
 University of Hagen (distance learning; open university)
 University of Halle-Wittenberg (also in Wittenberg)
 University of Hamburg
 HafenCity University Hamburg
 Hamburg University of Technology
 Helmut Schmidt University (University of the Bundeswehr, Hamburg)
 Hertie School of Governance (private institution with university status, awards PhD)
 Leibniz University Hannover
 University of Heidelberg
 University of Hildesheim
 University of Hohenheim

I–N
 Technical University of Ilmenau
 Jacobs University Bremen
 University of Jena
 Kaiserslautern University of Technology
 Karlsruhe Institute of Technology
 University of Kassel
 University of Kiel
 University of Koblenz-Landau
 University of Konstanz
 University of Leipzig
 University of Lübeck
 Leuphana University of Lüneburg
 University of Magdeburg
 University of Mainz
 University of Mannheim
 University of Marburg
 Technical University of Munich
 Ludwig Maximilian University of Munich
 Bundeswehr University Munich
 Ukrainian Free University Munich (private university; awards PhD)
 University of Münster
 University of Erlangen-Nuremberg

O–Z
 University of Oldenburg
 University of Osnabrück
 University of Paderborn
 University of Passau
 University of Potsdam
 University of Regensburg
 University of Rostock
 Saarland University
 University of Siegen
 German University of Administrative Sciences Speyer
 University of Stuttgart
 University of Trier
 University of Tübingen
 University of Ulm
 University of Halle-Wittenberg (also in Halle)
 University of Vechta
 University of Weimar
 Witten/Herdecke University
 University of Wuppertal
 University of Würzburg

Universities by geographic region

North 
 University of Bremen
 Jacobs University Bremen
 University of Flensburg
 University of Göttingen
 University of Greifswald
 University of Hamburg
 Helmut Schmidt University (University of the Bundeswehr, Hamburg)
 Leibniz University Hannover
 University of Hildesheim
 University of Kiel
 University of Lübeck
 University of Lüneburg
 University of Oldenburg
 University of Osnabrück
 University of Rostock
 University of Vechta

West 
 Bielefeld University
 Ruhr University Bochum
 University of Bonn
 University of Cologne
 Technical University of Dortmund
 University of Duisburg-Essen
 University of Düsseldorf
 Goethe University Frankfurt
 University of Giessen
 University of Hagen (distance learning; open university)
 University of Kassel
 University of Koblenz
 University of Mainz
 University of Marburg
 University of Münster
 University of Paderborn
 Saarland University
 University of Trier
 University of Siegen
 German University of Administrative Sciences Speyer
 Witten/Herdecke University
 University of Wuppertal
 Frankfurt School of Finance & Management

East 
 Berlin University of the Arts
 Dresden University of Technology
 Free University of Berlin
 Humboldt University of Berlin
 Hertie School of Governance
 Technical University of Berlin
 Technical University of Ilmenau
 University of Erfurt
 University of Halle-Wittenberg
 University of Jena
 University of Leipzig
 University of Magdeburg
 University of Potsdam
 University of Weimar
 Viadrina University (Frankfurt an der Oder)

South 
 University of Augsburg
 University of Bamberg
 University of Bayreuth
 Catholic University of Eichstätt-Ingolstadt
 University of Erlangen-Nuremberg
 University of Freiburg
 Zeppelin University (Friedrichshafen)
 University of Heidelberg
 University of Hohenheim
 Karlsruhe Institute of Technology
 University of Konstanz
 University of Mannheim
 Bundeswehr University of Munich
 University of Munich
 Ukrainian Free University Munich
 University of Passau
 University of Regensburg
 University of Stuttgart
 University of Tübingen
 University of Ulm
 University of Würzburg

Universities of Technology by location 

 RWTH Aachen University
 Technical University of Berlin
 Brandenburg University of Technology
 Braunschweig University of Technology
 Chemnitz University of Technology
 Clausthal University of Technology
 Technical University of Dortmund
 Darmstadt University of Technology
 Dresden University of Technology
 Freiberg University of Mining and Technology
 Hamburg University of Technology
 Leibniz University Hannover
 Ilmenau University of Technology
 Kaiserslautern University of Technology
 Karlsruhe Institute of Technology
 Technical University of Munich
 University of Stuttgart

See also 
 Charles University in Prague (Karls-Universität) – The first German university
 Education in Germany
 Franco-German University – An organization of universities across France and Germany
 German Academic Exchange Service
 German Universities Excellence Initiative
 List of oldest universities in continuous operation
 Open access in Germany
 TU9 – An association of 9 German technical universities
 U15 – An association of 15 German research-intensive universities
 UAS7 – An association of 7 German Universities of Applied Sciences

References

External links 

 Association of North German Universities (Verbund Norddeutscher Universitäten)
 Complete list of German universities – Higher Education Compass (Hochschulkompass)
 German Universities – Federal Ministry of Education and Research (Bundesministerium für Bildung und Forschung)
Times Higher Education German University rankings

Universities
 
Universities
Germany
Germany